The 1996 Davis Cup (also known as the 1996 Davis Cup by NEC for sponsorship purposes) was the 85th edition of the Davis Cup, the most important tournament between national teams in men's tennis. 124 teams entered the competition, 16 in the World Group, 26 in the Americas Zone, 29 in the Asia/Oceania Zone, and 53 in the Europe/Africa Zone. Antigua and Barbuda, Armenia, Azerbaijan, Bosnia and Herzegovina, Botswana, Iceland, Liechtenstein and Panama made their first appearances in the tournament.

France defeated the Sweden in the final at the Massan Hall in Malmö.

World Group

Draw

Final
Sweden vs. France

World Group Qualifying Round

Date: 20–22 September

The eight losing teams in the World Group first round ties and eight winners of the Zonal Group I final round ties competed in the World Group Qualifying Round for spots in the 1997 World Group.

Americas Zone

Group I

Group II

Group III
 Venue: Maya Country Club, San Salvador, El Salvador
 Date: 6–10 March

Group A

Group B

  and  promoted to Group II in 1997.
 ,  and  assigned to Group IV in 1997.

Asia/Oceania Zone

Group I

Group II

Group III
 Venue: Aviation Club Tennis Centre, Dubai, United Arab Emirates
 Date: 18–24 March

Group A

Group B

  and  promoted to Group II in 1997.

Europe/Africa Zone

Group I

Group II

Group III

Zone A
 Venue: T.E.D. Club, Istanbul, Turkey
 Date: 20–26 May

Group A

Group B

  and  promoted to Group II in 1997.

Zone B
 Venue: Nairobi Club Ground, Nairobi, Kenya
 Date: 8–14 January

Group A

Group B

  and  promoted to Group II in 1997.

References
General

Specific

External links
Davis Cup Official Website

 
Davis Cups by year
Davis Cup
Davis Cup